CTN Animation Expo is an annual three day animation convention that focuses on putting "the talent" center stage. It is held at the Marriott Convention Center in Burbank, California during what is officially proclaimed by the City of Burbank to be "Animation Week" for this event. Founded by animation talent veteran Tina Price this event is presented by the Creative Talent Network. It was first held in 2009, from November 20 to 22.

Participating Companies
 Blue Sky Animation Studios
 Cartoon Network
 Digital Domain Media
 DisneyToon Studios
 Disney Television Animation
 Dragonherder Entertainment
 DreamWorks Animation
 Duncan Studio
 Gentle Giant Studios
 Hasbro
 Jim Henson Studios
 Laika Animation Studios
 Nickelodeon
 Pepper Films
 Pixar
 Rhythm and Hues Studios
 Sony Pictures Animation
 Stone Circle Pictures
 Threshold Entertainment
 Walt Disney Animation Studios

References

External links 
 ctnanimationexpo.com
 creativetalentnetwork.com
 ctnanimationexpo.com

Multigenre conventions
Festivals in Los Angeles
Recurring events established in 2009